L'Angelica is a serenata by João de Sousa Carvalho to a libretto by Metastasio previously . The plot concerns how Angelica thwarts the noble Orlando and elopes with Medoro. The 1720 serenata Angelica e Medoro by Nicola Porpora is a setting of the same libretto.

Recording
L'Angelica, Joana Seara (soprano), Lidia Vinyes Curtis (mezzo), Fernando Guimarães (tenor), Tavares, Medeiros, Concerto Campestre, Pedro Castro. 2 CDs Naxos

References

1778 operas
Italian-language operas
Operas
Operas based on works by Ludovico Ariosto